The Tony Award for Best Performance by a Leading Actress in a Play is an honor presented at the Tony Awards, a ceremony established in 1947 as the Antoinette Perry Awards for Excellence in Theatre. The award is given to actresses for quality leading roles in a Broadway play. Despite the award first being presented in 1947, there were no nominees announced until 1956. There have been two ties in this category, and one three-way tie.

Winners and nominees

1940s

1950s

1960s

1970s

1980s
{| class="wikitable" style="width:98%;"
|- style="background:#bebebe;"
! style="width:11%;"| Year
! style="width:27%;"| Actress
! style="width:33%;"| Play
! style="width:29%;"| Character
|-
| rowspan="5" align="center"| 1980
|- style="background:#B0C4DE" 
| Phyllis Frelich
| Children of a Lesser God
| Sarah Norman
|-
| Blythe Danner
| Betrayal
| Emma
|-
| Maggie Smith
| Night and Day
| Ruth Carson
|-
| Anne Twomey
| Nuts
| Claudia Draper
|-
| rowspan="5" align="center"| 1981
|- style="background:#B0C4DE" 
| Jane Lapotaire
| Piaf
| Édith Piaf
|-
| Glenda Jackson
| Rose
| Rose
|-
| Eva Le Gallienne
| To Grandmother's House We Go
| Grandie
|-
| Elizabeth Taylor
| The Little Foxes
| Regina Giddens
|-
| rowspan="5" align="center"| 1982
|- style="background:#B0C4DE" 
| Zoe Caldwell
| Medea
| Medea
|-
| Katharine Hepburn
| The West Side Waltz
| Margaret Mary Elderdice
|-
| Geraldine Page
| Agnes of God
| Mother Miriam Ruth
|-
| Amanda Plummer
| A Taste of Honey
| Josephine
|-
| rowspan="5" align="center"| 1983
|- style="background:#B0C4DE" 
| Jessica Tandy
| Foxfire
| Annie Nations
|-
| Kathy Bates
| 'night, Mother
| Jessie Cates
|-
| Kate Nelligan
| Plenty
| Susan Traherne
|-
| Anne Pitoniak
| night, Mother| Thelma Cates
|-
| rowspan="5" align="center"| 1984
|- style="background:#B0C4DE" 
| Glenn Close
| The Real Thing| Annie
|-
| Rosemary Harris
| Heartbreak House| Hesione Hushabye
|-
| Linda Hunt
| End of the World| Audrey Wood
|-
| Kate Nelligan
| A Moon for the Misbegotten| Josie Hogan
|-
| rowspan="5" align="center"| 1985
|- style="background:#B0C4DE" 
| Stockard Channing
| A Day in the Death of Joe Egg| Sheila
|-
| Sinéad Cusack
| Much Ado About Nothing| Beatrice
|-
| Rosemary Harris
| Pack of Lies| Barbara Jackson
|-
| Glenda Jackson
| Strange Interlude| Nina Leeds
|-
| rowspan="5" align="center"| 1986
|- style="background:#B0C4DE" 
| Lily Tomlin
| The Search for Signs of Intelligent Life in the Universe| Various Characters
|-
| Rosemary Harris
| Hay Fever| Judith Bliss
|-
| Mary Beth Hurt
| Benefactors| Sheila
|-
| Jessica Tandy
| The Petition| Elizabeth Milne
|-
| rowspan="5" align="center"| 1987
|- style="background:#B0C4DE" 
| Linda Lavin
| Broadway Bound| Kate Jerome
|-
| Lindsay Duncan
| Dangerous Liaisons| Marquise de Merteuil
|-
| Geraldine Page
| Blithe Spirit| Madame Arcati
|-
| Amanda Plummer
| Pygmalion| Eliza Doolittle
|-
| rowspan="5" align="center"|1988
|- style="background:#B0C4DE" 
| Joan Allen
| Burn This| Anna Mann
|-
| Blythe Danner
| A Streetcar Named Desire| Blanche DuBois
|-
| Glenda Jackson
| Macbeth| Lady Macbeth
|-
| Frances McDormand
| A Streetcar Named Desire| Stella Kowalski
|-
| rowspan="5" align="center"| 1989
|- style="background:#B0C4DE" 
| Pauline Collins
| Shirley Valentine| Shirley Valentine
|-
| Joan Allen
| The Heidi Chronicles| Heidi Holland
|-
| Madeline Kahn
| Born Yesterday| Emma 'Billie' Dawn
|-
| Kate Nelligan
| Spoils of War| Elise
|}

1990s

2000s

 

2010s

2020s

Multiple wins

 5 Wins
 Julie Harris

 3 Wins
 Zoe Caldwell
 Jessica Tandy

 2 Wins
 Shirley Booth
 Glenn Close
 Uta Hagen
 Helen Hayes
 Cherry Jones
 Margaret Leighton
 Mary-Louise Parker
 Irene Worth

Multiple nominations

 9 Nominations
 Julie Harris

 8 Nominations
 Rosemary Harris

 7 Nominations
 Colleen Dewhurst

 6 Nominations
 Jane Alexander

 5 Nominations
 Stockard Channing
 Cherry Jones
 Laura Linney
 Mary-Louise Parker

 4 Nominations
 Eileen Atkins
 Glenda Jackson
 Linda Lavin
 Margaret Leighton
 Laurie Metcalf
 Estelle Parsons
 Maureen Stapleton
 Jessica Tandy
 Irene Worth

 3 Nominations
 Zoe Caldwell
 Helen Hayes
 Madeline Kahn
 Janet McTeer
 Helen Mirren
 Kate Nelligan
 Geraldine Page
 Lynn Redgrave
 Vanessa Redgrave
 Diana Rigg
 Maggie Smith

 2 Nominations
 Joan Allen
 Nina Arianda
 Elizabeth Ashley
 Jayne Atkinson
 Anne Bancroft
 Barbara Bel Geddes
 Eve Best
 Shirley Booth
 Kate Burton
 Glenn Close
 Gladys Cooper
 Blythe Danner
 Lindsay Duncan
 Jennifer Ehle
 Tovah Feldshuh
 Uta Hagen
 Swoosie Kurtz
 Audra McDonald
 Frances McDormand
 Siobhán McKenna
 Claudia McNeil
 Amy Morton
 Cynthia Nixon
 Amanda Plummer
 Phylicia Rashad
 Mercedes Ruehl
 Marian Seldes
 Kim Stanley
 Kathleen Turner
 Liv Ullmann

Multiple character wins

 3 Wins
 Medea from Medea 2 Wins
 Amanda Prynne from Private Lives Annie from The Real Thing Joan of Arc from Joan of Lorraine and The Lark Mary Tyrone from Long Day's Journey Into Night Nora Helmer from A Doll's House and A Doll's House Part 2Multiple character nominations

 5 Nominations
 Josie Hogan from A Moon for the Misbegotten 4 Nominations
 Medea from Medea Martha from Who's Afraid of Virginia Woolf? 3 Nominations
 Amanda Prynne from Private Lives Beatrice from Much Ado About Nothing Claire Zachanassian from The Visit Joan of Arc from Joan of Lorraine, The Lark, and Saint Joan Lady Macbeth from Macbeth Lena Younger from A Raisin in the Sun Maggie Pollitt from Cat on a Hot Tin Roof Mary Tyrone from Long Day's Journey into Night Nora Helmer from A Doll's House and A Doll's House, Part 2 2 Nominations
 Amanda Wingfield from The Glass Menagerie Anna Christopherson from Anna Christie Annie from The Real Thing Blanche DuBois from A Streetcar Named Desire Claire from A Delicate Balance Eleanor of Aquitaine from The Lion in Winter Elizabeth I from Vivat! Vivat Regina! and Mary Stuart Elizabeth Proctor from The Crucible Emma from Betrayal Emma 'Billie' Dawn from Born Yesterday Fonsia Dorsey from The Gin Game Golda Meir from Golda and Golda's Balcony Heidi Holland from The Heidi Chronicles Hesione Hushabye from Heartbreak House Josephine from A Taste of Honey Julie Cavendish from The Royal Family Kyra Hollis from Skylight Lola Delaney from Come Back, Little Sheba Portia from The Merchant of Venice Princess Cosmonopolis from Sweet Bird of Youth Regina Giddens from The Little Foxes Ruth from The Homecoming Sarah Norman from Children of a Lesser God Sheila from A Day in the Death of Joe EggProductions with multiple nominationsThe Chalk Garden -- Gladys Cooper and Siobhán McKennaToys In The Attic -- Maureen Stapleton and Irene WorthThe Killing of Sister George -- Beryl Reid (winner) and Eileen Atkins'night, Mother -- Kathy Bates and Anne PitoniakA Streetcar Named Desire -- Blythe Danner and Frances McDormandThe Sisters Rosensweig --  Madeline Kahn (winner) and Jane AlexanderA Delicate Balance -- Rosemary Harris and Elaine StritchAugust: Osage County -- Deanna Dunagan (winner) and Amy MortonGod of Carnage -- Marcia Gay Harden (winner) and Hope DavisMary Stuart -- Janet McTeer and Harriet Walter (God of Carnage and Mary Stuart'' were produced in the same year)

Multiple awards and nominationsActress who have been nominated multiple times in any acting categories'''

References

External links
 Internet Broadway Database Awards Archive
 Official Tony Awards Website Archive

Tony Awards
Theatre acting awards
Awards established in 1947
1947 establishments in the United States
Awards for actresses